, also known as  is a Japanese streamer, YouTuber and tarento. He is mainly active in Niconico (Niconico Live), YouTube, Twitch and Abema. His talent agency is MURASH.

Biography 
Kato was born in Tateyama, Chiba.

On 5 July 2009, Kato posted his first Let's Play video on Niconico. At the time of posting  on 12 July, his Niconico's username was "Unko-chan", so he called himself "Unko-chan".

While Kato worked as a health professional, he continued to stream Let's Play videos as Unko-chan. On 2015, Kato announced that his real name is Junichi Kato, and since then he has been active mainly under this name. In the summer of 2016, Kato retired from the health professional, and he joined MURASH. As of 2022, Kato is popular as a streamer due to live streaming on YouTube, Niconico and Twitch, and performs on many web streams and at events.

References

External links 
 加藤 純一 (業務提携) - MURASH
 
 
 UNKちゃんねる's channel on Niconico
 ねもうすちゃんねる's community on Niconico
 Junichi Kato on TwitCasting
 Junichi Kato on OPENREC.tv
 

Japanese television personalities
Gaming YouTubers
Japanese YouTubers
People from Chiba Prefecture
Twitch (service) streamers
1985 births
Living people